The ZIL-135 is a large, eight-wheeled military transport and self-propelled artillery truck produced during the Cold War by the Soviet Union starting in 1959. Its purpose was to carry and launch an artillery missile, specifically a FROG-7, from surface-to-surface. The ZIL-135 was widely exported to other communist countries, most notably North Korea, where it is a common sight in films and military marches. It also served as the TEL for the BM-27 Uragan artillery rocket system.

This vehicle has two gasoline engines that power its 20 tonnes to a maximum speed of 65 kilometers per hour. One engine drives the four wheels on the left of the truck, while the other engine drives the four wheels on the right. The ZIL-135 has eight wheel drive, but only the front and rear axles are used for steering. It has a maximum cruising range of 500 kilometers.

The cab of the ZIL-135 is NBC protected, allowing the rockets to be fired without exposing the crew to possible contaminants. The six-man crew can emplace or displace the system in three minutes.

Variants

ZiL
ZIL-135 (9P113): launcher for FROG-7 (Luna-M) missile (1959)
ZIL-135B: amphibious version of ZIL-135 (1959)
ZIL-135e: non-amphibious version of ZIL-135B (1960)
ZIL-135E: Diesel-electric transmission (1965)
ZIL-135K: launcher for C-5 missile (1961)
ZIL-135KM: launcher for SS-N-3 Shaddock missile (1962, prototype for BAZ)
ZIL-135KP: land train (1969)
ZIL-135L: improved suspension (1961)
ZIL-135LM: ZIL-135L with manual transmission (1964)
ZIL-135LN: chassis-cab based on ZIL-135K
ZIL-135P: amphibious landing transport (landing barge) (1965)
ZIL-135SH: zero-turn radius (1967)

BAZ
ZIL-135K: launcher for FCR-2 missile (1961)
BAZ-135LM: ZIL-135K with manual transmission (1963)
BAZ-135LMT (BAZ-135L7): tropical weather version of BAZ-135LM (1968) 
BAZ-135LMP: launcher for BM-27 Uragan MLRS (1976)
BAZ-135LTM: transporter for Luna-M missile (1963)
BAZ-135L4: civilian version (1968)
BAZ-E135G: experimental prototype with gas turbine engine
BAZ-135M1: prototype with a single diesel engine
BAZ-135MB: launcher for SPU-35V, Tu-143 and Tu-243 (1964)
BAZ-135MBP: BAZ-135MB with metal cargo platform
BAZ-135MBK: BAZ-135MB with increased cargo and towing capacity (1991)
BAZ-135MBL: (1993)

Specifications
 Length: 
 Width: 
 Height: 
 GVW (without missile): 11.57 tons
 Ground clearance: 
 Pitch angle: 57°
 Engine: 2 X ZIL-375YA V-8 6.9 liter gas engines
 Horsepower:  X 2
 Top speed: 
 Range: 
 Fuel consumption:  -

References

 

Wheeled self-propelled rocket launchers
ZiL vehicles
Military trucks of the Soviet Union
Military vehicles introduced in the 1950s
Amphibious military vehicles